The TXT402 password trading system is an international system that enables online sale of passwords for everything, which allows to put a password on. Placing secured materials on servers and share links to files and passwords on TXT402 became one of the e-business methods.

It is used for buying and selling PDF files, Microsoft Office documents, OpenOffice.org documents, compressed files in RAR and ZIP (e.g. mp3), passworded access to web pages, FTP servers, programs and games.

System operational rules 
Seller
 establishing a password for the material for sale
 enrolling the password into an individual account on TXT402.com and downloading the link to it 
 transferring links to the material for sale and the password to the buyer (via: the Internet, e-mail, instant messaging) 
 receiving funds on your PayPal account.

Buyer
 Acquiring the purchased material (downloaded from the websites uploading services, creating websites and other) 
 visiting TXT402.com page through a link received from the salesman
 paying for the password and reading (viewing) it 
 unlocking the access to the purchased material

Password payments 
A buyer can acquire a password to a file without registering using a payment system: PayPal or as a logged in TXT402 user (after recharging the account with funds).

See also 
Electronic commerce
Paid content
Electronic business

References

External links 
TXT402.com
new opening

Online content distribution